Tord Peterson (21 April 1926 – 11 January 2021) was a Swedish actor. From 1953 onwards, he appeared in more than 80 films and television shows.

Peterson died in January 2021, at the age of 94.

Selected filmography
 The Hard Game (1956)
 Nightmare (1965)
 The Shot (1969)
 Grisjakten (1970)
 Honeymoon (1972)
 House of Angels (1992)
 House of Angels – The Second Summer (1994)
 Echoes from the Dead (2013)

References

External links

1926 births
2021 deaths
Male actors from Stockholm
Swedish male film actors